Paul Cetrangolo (born 29 June 1978) is a retired Australian soccer referee.

Cetrangolo was a FIFA international assistant referee between 2010–2018. 
Cetrangolo accompanied Ben Williams to the 2014 FIFA Club World Cup and the 2015 AFC Asian Cup along with fellow Australian Matthew Cream.
He has also officiated at the 2012 AFC Champions League Final. On 11 November 2022 he took the field as an assistant referee for the 173rd and final time in the Australian A League in the match between Adelaide United and Melbourne Victory as he announced his retirement from the Australian national leagues.

Family 

His wife is Antonietta Cetrangolo, to whom he is currently married with two children, Christian and Oscar.

References

Australian soccer referees
Living people
1978 births